The Egg Dance is a 1552 oil on panel genre painting by the Dutch artist Pieter Aertsen, now in the Rijksmuseum in Amsterdam, which bought it in 1839 from the collection of Colonel von Schepeler in Aachen. It depicts preparations for the Easter or carnival custom of an egg dance.

External links
Rijksmuseum website

1552 paintings
Paintings in the collection of the Rijksmuseum
Dance in art
Food and drink paintings
Musical instruments in art